Q'iwiri (Aymara q'iwi a curved line; a cord wound around the hat or other things, -ri a suffix, Hispanicized spelling Quihuire) is a  mountain in the Peruvian Andes. It is located in the Moquegua Region, Mariscal Nieto Province, Carumas District, and in the Puno Region, Puno Province, in the districts Acora and Pichacani. Q'iwiri lies northwest of Qurini and north of a lake named Aqhuya Ch'alla (Pasto Grande).

References

Mountains of Moquegua Region
Mountains of Puno Region
Mountains of Peru